Martijn Thomassen (born 6 June 1990 in Geldrop) is a Dutch professional footballer who plays as a defender. He formerly played for AGOVV Apeldoorn and FC Eindhoven. He is currently without a club.

External links
 Voetbal International

1990 births
Living people
Dutch footballers
AGOVV Apeldoorn players
FC Eindhoven players
Eerste Divisie players
People from Geldrop
Association football fullbacks
Footballers from North Brabant